The iPhone is a line of smartphones designed and marketed by Apple Inc. that use Apple's iOS mobile operating system. The first-generation iPhone was announced by former Apple CEO Steve Jobs on January 9, 2007. Since then, Apple has annually released new iPhone models and iOS updates. iPhone naming has followed various patterns throughout its history.

Nomenclature

Current naming style 
iPhones are named with "iPhone" followed by a number, which denotes the iPhone generation, and sometimes a suffix (such as C, S, Plus, Pro, Pro Max). The current naming pattern is that "Plus" or "Max" indicates a physical larger iPhone model of the same generation (iPhone XS Max, 11 Pro Max, 12 Pro Max, 13 Pro Max, 14 Plus, 14 Pro Max). "Pro" indicates the higher end model (iPhone 12 Pro, 13 Pro, 14 Pro). Currently, models with just a number (i.e. without a suffix) indicate the lower-priced iPhones (iPhone 11, 12, 13, 14). The "SE" used in the iPhone SE line stands for "Special Edition".

Previous naming style 
"S" used to denote a slight upgrade (iPhone 3GS, 4S, 5S, 6S & 6S Plus, XS & XS Max), but it has since been dropped; iPhone XS and XS Max were the last models to feature the "S" (iPhone 12, 12 Pro, 12 Pro Max instead of iPhone 11S, 11S Pro, 11S Pro Max). "C" used to denote the lower-priced and smaller sized iPhones (iPhone 5C). iPhone X (pronounced "10"), iPhone XR (pronounced "10R") and iPhone XS and XS Max (pronounced "10S") are currently the only iPhones to have been branded with roman numerals (X).

iPhones 
38 different iPhone models have been produced:

 iPhone (2007–2008)
 iPhone 3G (2008–2010)
 iPhone 3GS (2009–2012)
 iPhone 4 (2010–2013)
 iPhone 4S (2011–2014)
 iPhone 5 (2012–2013)
 iPhone 5C (2013–2015)
 iPhone 5S (2013–2016)
 iPhone 6 (2014–2016)
 iPhone 6 Plus (2014–2016)
 iPhone 6S (2015–2018)
 iPhone 6S Plus (2015–2018)
 iPhone SE (1st) (2016–2018)
 iPhone 7 (2016–2019)
 iPhone 7 Plus (2016–2019)
 iPhone 8 (2017–2020)
 iPhone 8 Plus (2017–2020)
 iPhone X (2017–2018)
 iPhone XR (2018–2021)
 iPhone XS (2018–2019)
 iPhone XS Max (2018–2019)
 iPhone 11 (2019–2022) 
 iPhone 11 Pro (2019–2020) 
 iPhone 11 Pro Max (2019–2020) 
 iPhone SE (2nd) (2020–2022)
 iPhone 12 mini (2020–2022)
 iPhone 12 (2020–present)
 iPhone 12 Pro (2020–2021)
 iPhone 12 Pro Max (2020–2021)
 iPhone 13 mini (2021–present)
 iPhone 13 (2021–present)
 iPhone 13 Pro (2021–2022)
 iPhone 13 Pro Max (2021–2022)
 iPhone SE (3rd) (2022–present)
 iPhone 14 (2022–present)
 iPhone 14 Plus (2022–present)
 iPhone 14 Pro (2022–present)
 iPhone 14 Pro Max (2022–present)

Timeline

Models never made
No models called the iPhone 2, iPhone 7S, iPhone 8S, iPhone 9, iPhone 11S, iPhone 12S and iPhone 13S were ever produced; however, iPhone 9 was the rumored name for the iPhone SE (2020).

The 1st-generation iPhone was colloquially known, retronymically, as the iPhone 2G, as the 2nd generation iPhone was the iPhone 3G. The iPhone 4 did not support 4G; the iPhone 5 was the first with LTE support, while the iPhone 12 and 12 Pro were the first with 5G support.

References

IPhone
IOS